Echinostomatinae is a subfamily of trematodes in the order Plagiorchiida, first described in 1899.

Genera 
According to the World Register of Marine Species, the following genera are accepted within Echinostomatinae:

 Bashkirovitrema Skrjabin, 1944
 Drepanocephalus Dietz, 1909
 Echinodollfusia Skrjabin & Baschkirova, 1956
 Echinoparyphium Dietz, 1909
 Echinostoma Rudolphi, 1809
 Edietziana Ozdikmen, 2013
 Euparyphium Dietz, 1909
 Hypoderaeum Dietz, 1909
 Isthmiophora Lühe, 1909
 Kostadinovatrema Dronen, 2009
 Longicollia Bychovskaja-Pavlovskaja, 1953
 Lyperorchis Travassos, 1921
 Moliniella Hübner, 1939
 Neoacanthoparyphium Yamaguti, 1958
 Pameileenia Wright & Smithers, 1956
 Parallelotestis Belopolskaya, 1954
 Petasiger Dietz, 1909
 Prionosomoides Teixeira de Freitas & Dobbin, 1967
 Singhia Yamaguti, 1958

References 

Plagiorchiida